Ikoma, Nata, and Isenye are the ethnic names for a Bantu language of Tanzania.

Writing system

References

Languages of Tanzania
Great Lakes Bantu languages